Puaucho is a hamlet located in the West of Osorno Province, southern Chile. Puaucho is the administrative centre of San Juan de la Costa commune. In 2017 Puaucho had a population of 305 inhabitants up from 300 in 2002.

References

Geography of Los Lagos Region
Populated places in Osorno Province